Diana Copperwhite  (born 1969) is an Irish painter. She is a member of Aosdána, an elite Irish association of artists.

Early life
Copperwhite was born in Limerick in 1969. She grew up in Patrickswell. Her father, Patrick Copperwhite, was a science teacher and self-taught artist who exhibited at the Oriel Gallery.

Career
Copperwhite studied at Limerick School of Art and Design, the National College of Art and Design (NCAD, Dublin) and Winchester School of Art.

Copperwhite is chiefly known for her work in oil painting; art critic Gail Levin says that her work "creates an exquisite tension between abstraction and figuration or representation of any kind. […] vibrating spectral bands have become a kind of a trademark in Copperwhite’s recent large paintings […] Copperwhite believes that in her paintings she has responded to Ireland’s changeable weather, which may have caused her to see the world as if she was looking through a visor into a “grey low-light vision." She has also named 1960s psychedelic album covers as inspiration.

She lives and works in Dublin and New York City. She has lectured at NCAD, Western Sydney University and the University of Massachusetts; she was elected to Aosdána in 2021. Her work is on permanent exhibition at the Irish Museum of Modern Art, Limerick City Gallery of Art and Áras an Uachtaráin (the residence of the President of Ireland).

References

External links

Irish women painters
Aosdána members
Artists from County Limerick
Alumni of the University of Southampton
Alumni of the National College of Art and Design
Alumni of Limerick Institute of Technology
Members of the Royal Hibernian Academy
20th-century Irish painters
21st-century Irish painters
20th-century Irish women artists
21st-century Irish women artists
Living people

1969 births